The 2013 Aegon Classic was a women's tennis tournament played on outdoor grass courts. It was the 32nd edition of the event. It took place at the Edgbaston Priory Club in Birmingham, United Kingdom, between 10 and 16 June 2013. Unseeded Daniela Hantuchová won the singles title.

Singles main-draw entrants

Seeds 

 1 Rankings are as of May 27, 2013.

Other entrants 
The following players received wildcards into the main draw:
  Anne Keothavong
  Johanna Konta
  Tara Moore

The following players received entry from the qualifying draw:
  Casey Dellacqua
  Nadiia Kichenok
  Alla Kudryavtseva
  Kurumi Nara
  Alison Riske
  Maria Sanchez
  Ajla Tomljanović
  Alison Van Uytvanck

Withdrawals 
Before the tournament
  Marion Bartoli
  Mallory Burdette
  Garbiñe Muguruza
  Roberta Vinci

Doubles main-draw entrants

Seeds 

1 Rankings are as of May 27, 2013.

Other entrants 
The following pairs received wildcards into the doubles main draw:
  Anne Keothavong /  Johanna Konta
  Samantha Moore /  Melanie South

The following pair entry as alternates:
  Catalina Castaño /  Eleni Daniilidou

Withdrawals 
Before the tournament
  Johanna Konta (low back injury)
During the tournament
  Heather Watson (mid back injury)

Finals

Singles 

 Daniela Hantuchová defeated  Donna Vekić, 7–6(7–5), 6–4

Doubles 

 Ashleigh Barty /  Casey Dellacqua defeated  Cara Black /  Marina Erakovic, 7–5, 6–4

References

External links 
 

Birmingham Classic (tennis)
Aegon Classic
Aegon Classic
Aegon Classic
2013 in English tennis